Daniel Dewan Sewell (born March 16, 1981), better known as Danny Brown, is an American rapper, singer, and songwriter. He was described by MTV in 2011 as "one of rap's most unique figures in recent memory".

After amassing several mixtapes, Brown released his first studio album, The Hybrid (2010). He began to gain major recognition after the release of his second studio album, XXX (2011), which received critical acclaim and led him to be named "Artist of the Year" by Spin and the Metro Times. His third studio album, Old (2013), reached No. 18 on the US Billboard 200 chart and spawned the singles "Dip", "25 Bucks", and "Smokin & Drinkin". The latter peaked at No. 31 on the Top R&B/Hip-Hop songs chart. His fourth studio album, Atrocity Exhibition (2016), and his fifth studio album, uknowhatimsayin¿ (2019), both received critical acclaim.

Early life 
Brown was born Daniel Dewan Sewell in Detroit on March 16, 1981, the son of an 18-year-old mother and 16-year-old father. His father is half Filipino. His talent for rhyming came at a very young age, as his mother would read Dr. Seuss books to him as a child; when he began to speak, he would talk in rhyme. His father was a house DJ who exposed him to all the music he would spin, as well as music from the likes of Roy Ayers, LL Cool J, Esham, and A Tribe Called Quest. For as long as he could remember, Brown had always wanted to be a rapper: "In kindergarten I'd say I wanted to be a rapper and people'd just laugh at me. 'That's a pretty funny job,' they'd say."

Brown's young parents did their best to shelter him from the Detroit street crime and gang life: "My parents ain't really want me out the house. They did as much as they possibly could to keep me in the house with whatever the newest video game was. But you know you can only keep a kid in for so long. Plus that had me sheltered, so once I did get away I used to disappear for like four days." His two grandmothers helped provide for his family. His maternal grandmother worked for Chrysler, and she bought four to five houses: "To this day we still got those houses. She owns three houses in a row on that block. She raised her three children and a host of others in the middle house; the one to the left she paid cash for in the '90s from her long time neighbor; and the one on the right was her parents' home that she inherited when they died." She also owned two other homes on the east side of Detroit, one in which Brown was raised. The fifth house, also located on the east side, was occupied by his aunt and her family. Originally from the Dexter-Linwood way of Detroit, he later moved to Hamtramck. He heavily associates with Detroit in his music.

At age 18, Brown became a drug dealer: "Once I got above a certain age, all that parent shit stopped. My mom and my pops split up. Once my pops left, I was the man of the house. I always told myself I was going to be a rapper my whole life. I was selling drugs since that's what all my friends were doing. And it was kind of like something to rap about maybe." Although his intentions were to stop once he got in trouble with the law, Brown was already too accustomed to the lifestyle: "I always told myself once I got my first [legal] case I was gonna stop. Then I got my first case, but I didn't stop. I got distribution and manufacturing and possession with intent to distribute. I was 19." His run-ins with the law didn't stop there: "I caught my second case loitering with some weed, but it violated my probation but I ran and I didn't go to court. I just ran for like at least five years. But once I got caught I had to do eight months. [...] I had nothing else, so I just started going back to studying music and trying to become a rapper." After his release from jail in 2002, he began to take his passion seriously and turn it into a career: "I had more confidence when I got out of jail because the day when I got out of jail I started selling weed. I ain't had no money after the first two months, like, 'I was way better off in jail.' By then I was already making my New York trips and going to recording studios so I was already serious when I got locked up."

Brown began his career in a hip hop group called Rese'vor Dogs, alongside fellow Detroit-based rappers Chips and Dopehead. In 2003, the trio independently released an album titled Runispokets-N-Dumpemindariva under Ren-A-Sance Entertainment and F.B.C. Records. In the summer of 2003, the group received mild rotation on Detroit radio stations with their lead single, "Yes". After growing up on hip hop and tuning his rhyming skills in the city, Brown landed the attention of Roc-A-Fella Records A&R Travis Cummings, who flew Brown out to New York City, where he began recording in other artists' studios. After a lack of success with Roc-A-Fella, Brown returned to Detroit and eventually linked up with Detroit-based producer Nick Speed.

Career

2010: The Hybrid 

In 2010, Brown befriended fellow American rapper Tony Yayo of G-Unit, and they recorded their collaborative album Hawaiian Snow (2010). The G-Unit association led many to wonder if Brown would eventually sign with G-Unit leader 50 Cent's label G-Unit Records. However, he did not fit G-Unit's image as he favors fitted jeans and a vintage rock-inspired wardrobe, with Brown later telling MTV: "It was a real thing. 50 was with it; he just didn't sign me because of my jeans. He liked the music, but he didn't like the way I looked. I understand where they were coming from with that, but you gotta understand where I'm coming from too: I'm from Detroit."

After recording and releasing four volumes of his Detroit State of Mind mixtape series and other free self-released mixtapes, Brown released his first solo studio album, The Hybrid (2010), on indie record label Rappers I Know. It was this album where he began to use his trademark high-pitched voice: "The first song that I ever rapped [with the high-pitched voice] was 'The Hybrid,' that's why we called it 'The Hybrid.' I think that was [when I found my voice]. That was the statement that I can rap and I can do every style of rap." The album came to fruition after he had written the aforementioned song: "The Hybrid started out because I started working with Hex Murder. Hex was managing me at the time and I had started recording in Black Milk's studio. We were working on a project and I had come up with the song 'The Hybrid,' so that gave me my whole intent on what I wanted to do with my next project. I started writing a new album and that's the album that I wrote. Then I hooked up with my homie Magnetic and he would just look out for me and gave me free studio time—so I would go record from 3 in the morning til 6 in the morning, because we were using the free time when nobody was there. Then I hooked up with Frank from Rappers I Know. I liked what he was doing with his blog. He looked out for me and helped me out a lot and then we put it out and the rest is history."

2011–2012: XXX 

On March 15, 2011, it was revealed Brown had signed to Brooklyn-based indie record label Fool's Gold Records: "My manager [Emeka Obi] asked me who I wanted to sign to and I said there's two labels I want to sign to: XL or Fool's Gold. He knew [people at] Fool's Gold. He saw Nick Catchdubs in a burrito spot, asked him about it, and Nick said he'd get back to him. Q-Tip and A-Trak went and ate lunch around last March. A-Trak told Q-Tip he was thinking about signing me and Q-Tip told him to do it. A-Trak called me and signed me. I met Q-Tip but I know Ali Shaheed more. Ali Shaheed is kind of like a mentor to me. Around the time of The Hybrid, I met him through Frank from Rappers I Know and he just started showing me love. We talk on the phone a lot."

Signing to Fool's Gold Records proved to be Brown's biggest commercial and critical move. The label would go on to release his second studio album, XXX, as a free download. It received numerous critical accolades, including being named the best hip hop album of the year by Spin. Pitchfork gave his album an 8.2 out of 10, saying, "If XXX was nothing but debauchery and desperation, it would quickly devolve into an endless slog. Thankfully, Brown is also hilariously funny, an endlessly inventive rapper driven to cook up outrageous variations on standard rap boasts." The publication later named XXX the 19th best album of 2011. XXX was also named the 6th-best album of 2011 by Passion of the Weiss, which called it "an uncomfortably honest self-portrait made even more remarkable by the fact that Danny Brown is alive to tell the story."

On November 1, 2011, Brown released his collaborative effort with American record producer Black Milk; an extended play (EP) appropriately titled Black and Brown!. On November 28, 2011, Brown released the music video for the XXX-cut, "Blunt After Blunt." The video was directed by fellow American rapper ASAP Rocky, who also made a cameo appearance. In the wake of his success with XXX, Brown began touring with Childish Gambino in March 2012. On March 13, 2012, Brown released the visual treatment for the brandUn DeShay-produced track "Radio Song" from XXX. The video was directed by Alex/2tone.

In 2012, Brown was featured on the cover of XXL as part of its annual "Top 10 Freshmen list" along with fellow then-up-and-coming rappers Hopsin, French Montana, MGK, Iggy Azalea and Roscoe Dash, among others. The Fader enlisted both Kendrick Lamar and Danny Brown to cover the front pages of its 2012 Spring Style issue. In a January 2012 interview, singer Jennifer Herrema revealed that Danny Brown would be featured on the second album by Australian electronic music group The Avalanches. Later in the year, Brown confirmed that he was working with The Avalanches on a song titled "Frankie Sinatra." On Brown's official website, he confirmed that he would be performing at the 13th Annual Gathering of the Juggalos. Brown signed a partnership deal with Adidas Originals, which is Brown's latest sportswear.

2012–2014: Old 

In February 2012, Brown was featured first on the cover of the publication The Fader, in its 78th issue. On March 22, 2012, Brown teamed up with Scion A/V to release a new song titled "Grown Up." The music video for "Grown Up," later released on August 20, was also presented by Scion A/V. In August 2012, it was rumored that Brown was working on a new album titled Danny Johnson, to be entirely produced by Johnson&Jonson (Blu and Mainframe), but Brown later denied these rumors and confirmed that the album had already been released for free in 2010, under the title It's a Art. In August, Brown also performed at the 13th annual Gathering of the Juggalos. In September, Brown teamed up with Scion A/V once again to release the debut project of his rap group Bruiser Brigade (a hip hop collective featuring Brown, Chips, Dopehead, Trpl Blk, ZelooperZ, and in-house producer SKYWLKR. The project was a four-track extended play (EP) eponymously titled Bruiser Brigade.

In October 2012, Brown was featured on the soundtrack to the film The Man with the Iron Fists on a track titled "Tick, Tock," alongside fellow American rappers Raekwon, Joell Ortiz and Pusha T. On October 24, 2012, Brown released the music video for a song titled "Witit," taken from the deluxe edition of XXX and his OD EP; later that day after Complex kept referring to his next album as Danny Johnson, Brown took to Twitter to reveal the correct tentative title to be ODB. From September to November, Brown appeared alongside Schoolboy Q and ASAP Mob as supporting acts for ASAP Rocky's 40-date national Long. Live. ASAP Tour.

In December 2012, Brown announced ODB had been completed. He explained that the album won't be as consistently humorous as XXX but said people will be surprised with the outcome: "The new album is done. We're pretty much just figuring out a way of presenting the right way to get released…the title of the album for now is ODB. I can't really elaborate on what that means until the album comes out, and then they'll get it. I don't want to give too much because then it'll be a much more rewarding listen for my fans." He continued, "It's a rewarding listen when I listen to it. I don't know if I laugh as much - I think I laugh when it's over with, and that's the difference between this album and XXX. With XXX, you laugh throughout it, and by the time it was over with, you were like, 'Oh that wasn't too funny.' This one, when it's over, you're laughing hysterically…it's not necessarily what's being said on the album, but the album [itself], like, 'I can't believe he made this.'" Rolling Stone magazine named Brown's single "Grown Up", the 41st-best song of 2012.

In a December 2012 interview with Pitchfork, Brown revealed the album would actually be titled Old. The album, released under Fool's Gold, was released to music retailers, unlike any of his previous releases. The album includes contributions from ASAP Rocky, Schoolboy Q, Ab-Soul, Kitty and Purity Ring, the latter of whom are contributing production, along with a hook from vocalist Megan James.

In January 2013, it was announced that Brown would be performing at the 2013 Coachella Valley Music and Arts Festival. In the summer of 2012, Kathy Griffin invited Danny Brown and ASAP Rocky to appear on the Valentine's Day episode of her talk show Kathy. On February 14, Brown appeared alongside ASAP Rocky and Russell Brand, on Griffin's late-night talk show where they played a dice game called "Suck breast? Kiss stomach?" and discussed the possibility of having children.

On March 1, 2013, Brown and American record producer Baauer, announced their upcoming "Worst of Both Worlds" Tour. For the trek, the Fool's Gold signees started off in Houston, Texas on April 9 at Fitzgerald's. The brief tour, which only hit the West Coast, made stops in Austin, Texas, Tucson, Arizona and San Francisco, California. They played both weekends of the Coachella Music and Arts Festival, wrapping up the tour on the second weekend (April 20). On March 8, Brown announced another tour in promotion for his upcoming album, the "Old & Reckless" Tour, featuring American female rapper Kitty. For his first-ever headlining tour, Brown began at SXSW on March 15 with a pair of shows. After completing his "Worst of Both Worlds" trek with Baauer, Kitty joined him for stops in St. Louis, Missouri, Ann Arbor, Michigan, New York City, New York and Madison, Wisconsin. The tour concluded at Indianapolis, Indiana's Deluxe on May 14. In March, Brown also won his first award ever at the 2013 Woodie Awards, winning in the "Best Video" category for "Grown Up."

On March 18, 2013, Brown revealed in a Twitter post that Old would be released around the time XXX came out, which was mid August. On March 23, it was announced Brown had signed a management deal with Goliath Artists, which also houses names such as Eminem, The Alchemist, Blink-182 and most recently Action Bronson, who has previously collaborated with Brown. On May 3, Brown announced through Twitter that Old would feature guest appearances from Freddie Gibbs, Schoolboy Q, Mr. MFN eXquire, Scrufizzer, ASAP Rocky, Ab-Soul, Charli XCX and Purity Ring. He also said the production on the album was handled by Paul White, Oh No, Rustie, Skywlkr, A-Trak, Darq E Freaker and Frank Dukes. After an unfinished version leaked earlier in the year, Brown visited Tim Westwood on BBC Radio 1xtra in June 2013 to premiere the official version of "Kush Coma," a song featuring ASAP Rocky taken from the Old album. On July 23, Brown was featured rapping alongside Insane Clown Posse in the music video for their song "When I'm Clownin'."

On August 12, Brown said on Twitter that he felt less than a priority at Fool's Gold Records: "Man #OLD fuck around and never come out ... Smh," tweeted Brown, referring to his forthcoming album Old. Brown then threatened to leak the album himself: "I'm a fuck around and leak that shit myself if niggas don't get it together." Subsequently, Fool's Gold Records founder A-Trak, announced that Old was indeed in the label pipeline, with a music video on the way. On August 26, 2013, Brown announced via Twitter that Old would be released on September 30, 2013. Old debuted at number 17 on the US Billboard 200, selling 15,000 copies in its first week of release.

On October 3, 2013, Danny Brown and A-Trak announced their "Double Trouble" tour. In November 2013, Brown was featured in the interactive music video for American singer-songwriter Bob Dylan's 1965 hit single "Like a Rolling Stone." In January 2014, Brown guest starred in the Fox animated TV series Lucas Bros. Moving Co., voicing a character named Jumanji in the first-season episode "A/C Tundra." Brown's song "Witit" was also featured in the episode. On January 22, 2014, Danny Brown made his network television debut with a special performance on Jimmy Kimmel Live!. Joined by Purity Ring vocalist Megan James, Brown performed "25 Bucks," a track off Old.

In April 2014, Hot Soup, one of Brown's early mixtapes, was re-released as a double LP and 7-inch with 7 bonus tracks for Record Store Day. It was also released on CD with a bonus disc of instrumentals. Along with Hot Soup, Brown also released Old as a double LP and a box set. On March 25, 2014, Brown appeared The Arsenio Hall Show, where he promoted his third album Old and performed the single "Dip" from the album.

On July 10, 2014, Brown opened for Macklemore & Ryan Lewis in front of 37,500 people in Marlay Park, Dublin. On July 11 and 12, Brown opened in front of 100,000 fans for Eminem's sold-out concert at Wembley Stadium in London. In November 2014, Brown appeared on the song "Detroit vs. Everybody" alongside fellow Detroit-based rappers Eminem, Royce Da 5'9", Trick-Trick, Dej Loaf and Big Sean, from the Shady Records compilation album Shady XV.

2014–2016: Atrocity Exhibition

 In October 2014, Brown announced he was working on a new album. In January 2015, Brown announced he was working on a Dr. Seuss-inspired children's book for his 13-year-old daughter. He told Australian radio station Triple J, "It's really about self-esteem in black girls. You know how black women do so muchprocess their hair, change their eye color? It's really about a little girl who does all these things to herself and changes herself, and she realizes she's just better off the way she is." In April 2015, when asked if his album was done, Brown responded: "Almost. I took a break from it cause I'm so ahead of schedule with it knowing it ain't coming out no time soon".

In 2015, Brown became the lead artist on the theme song for the ABC comedy series Fresh Off the Boat. On June 10, 2016, he revealed on Instagram that he was "putting the final touches" on his fourth album. On June 14, he announced his signing to Warp Records and released "When It Rain", the first official single from his upcoming album. On July 17, he stated his new album would be titled Atrocity Exhibition, taking inspiration from the Joy Division song. In August 2016, Brown appeared on The Eric Andre Show, alongside ASAP Rocky, Nocando, Open Mike Eagle, and Go Dreamer, in a segment titled "Rapper Warrior Ninja". His album Atrocity Exhibition was shortlisted by IMPALA (The Independent Music Companies Association) for the Album of the Year Award 2016, which rewards on a yearly basis the best album released on an independent European label.

2018–2022: uknowhatimsayin¿
In August 2018, Brown streamed via Twitch a collection of songs unofficially titled the Twitch EP.

In late April 2019, it was announced that Brown's fifth studio album titled uknowhatimsayin¿ would be released later that year, featuring production from Q-Tip, JPEGMafia, and Paul White. In June 2019, Viceland announced that Brown would star in a talk show titled "Danny's House" produced by Derrick Beckles. The show's first season began on August 14, 2019. Since August 12, 2019, he plays the character Griffin in Nathan Barnatt's web series Dad Feels and was featured in the song "Dad Feels Good". In December 2019, he appeared as himself in a Grand Theft Auto Online expansion as a radio host with Skepta. Brown also lent his voice to Yung Ancestor, another fictional character in the game. In 2020, Brown was once again featured on The Eric Andre Show, appearing with Talib Kweli as "Guest Judges" for the show's recurring segment "Rapper Warrior Ninja", after having been a contestant his previous appearance. In March 2021, he featured on the band Brockhampton's first single from their album Roadrunner: New Light, New Machine called "Buzzcut".

In 2022, Brown began hosting the weekly podcast The Danny Brown Show with YMH Studios.

Brown's sixth studio album, Quaranta, is set for release in 2023.

Personal life
Brown has a daughter who was born in 2002.

Discography

Studio albums
 The Hybrid (2010)
 XXX (2011)
 Old (2013)
 Atrocity Exhibition (2016)
 uknowhatimsayin¿ (2019)
 Quaranta (2023)
Collaborative albums

 Scaring the Hoes, Vol. 1 (2023) (with JPEGMafia)

Filmography
 White Boy Rick (2018)

Awards and nominations

References

External links
 
 Danny Brown on Myspace
Danny Brown Interview 2013

1981 births
African-American male rappers
African-American songwriters
Alternative hip hop musicians
American rappers of Filipino descent
Living people
Midwest hip hop musicians
Rappers from Detroit
Songwriters from Michigan
Underground rappers
21st-century American rappers
21st-century American male musicians
Warp (record label) artists
Twitch (service) streamers
21st-century African-American musicians
20th-century African-American people
American male songwriters